Mykola Pavlenko (born 7 May 1979) is a Ukrainian football player.

Pavlenko made one appearance in the Russian First Division for SKA Rostov-on-Don.

Pavlenko played for Finland's Premier division team RoPS, but he was released during the season on suspicion of playing in an arranged match.

References

External links
 

1979 births
Living people
People from Lozova
Ukrainian footballers
Association football goalkeepers
FC Zirka-2 Kirovohrad players
FC SKA Rostov-on-Don players
FC Arsenal Kyiv players
FC Kharkiv players
Rovaniemen Palloseura players
FC Spartak Moscow players
Veikkausliiga players
Ukrainian expatriate footballers
Expatriate footballers in Finland
Ukrainian expatriate sportspeople in Finland
Expatriate footballers in Russia
Ukrainian expatriate sportspeople in Russia
Expatriate footballers in Uzbekistan
Ukrainian expatriate sportspeople in Uzbekistan